Xu Ning is a fictional character in Water Margin, one of the four great classical novels in Chinese literature. Nicknamed "Gold Lancer", he ranks 18th among the 36 Heavenly Spirits, the first third of the 108 Stars of Destiny.

Background
The novel depicts Xu Ning as six chi tall, having a pale face studded with thick eyebrows, a thin moustache and ample at the waistline. An expert in spears, he is a rare master of the hooked lance, a Chinese spear with a hook attached next to the tip. He serves as the instructor of the Gold Lancers Unit of the imperial guard in Dongjing (東京; present-day Kaifeng, Henan), the imperial capital of the Song Empire.

Becoming an outlaw
The Song Court orders Huyan Zhuo to lead a military attack on Liangshan Marsh to stamp out the outlaws. The general deploys a special cavalry, which comprises groups of armoured horses linked by chains. As the horses charge forward as consolidated units, their stampede overwhelms the Liangshan force. Song Jiang, then Liangshan's second-in-command, has to hole up in the stronghold, relying on the marsh as a marsh, to find a way to counter the cavalry. Tang Long suggests his cousin Xu Ning, who is an ingenious user of the hooked lance, could fell the cavalry with the weapon. Agreeing with Tang's plan, Song sends him, Dai Zong, Shi Qian and Yue He to Dongjing to lure Xu Ning to Liangshan.

Shi Qian sneaks into Xu Ning's house after nightfall and steals a precious family heirloom of his – a golden armour vest that no object can pierce. When Xu Ning discovers that the vest, which was concealed on a beam, is stolen, he is extremely upset. Tang Long, who claims to come by to visit, tells Xu he has seen a man walking with a limp and carrying an embroidered box. Believing that the man is the stealer of the vest, Xu tells his wife to file temporary leave for him at his office as he embarks on a long chase with Tang after Shi Qian. The pursuit brings him close to Liangshan. They run into Yue He, who poses as a businessman. Hitching a ride on Yue's coach, Xu is offered a spiked drink which knocks him over. When he comes to, he is already in the stronghold of Liangshan.

Xu Ning is angry that he has been duped. However, when he gets his vest back and finds his family taken to Liangshan by Dai Zong, he reluctantly agrees to join the band. Xu trains some selected Liangshan foot soldiers in the use of the hooked lance. These lancers topple Huyan Zhuo's cavalry, causing his army to collapse.

Campaigns and death
Xu Ning is appointed as one of the Eight Tiger Cub Vanguard Generals of the Liangshan cavalry after the 108 Stars of Destiny came together in what is called the Grand Assembly. He participates in the campaigns against the Liao invaders and rebel forces in Song territory following amnesty from Emperor Huizong for Liangshan,

In the battle of Hangzhou in the campaign against Fang La, Xu Ning and Hao Siwen face Fang's son Fang Tianding. When Hao Siwen is captured by the enemy, Xu Ning attempts to save him but is hit in the neck by a poisoned arrow. He dies from the wound soon after.

References
 
 
 
 
 
 
 

36 Heavenly Spirits
Fictional characters from Henan